The 1893 Miami Redskins football team was an American football team that represented Miami University during the 1893 college football season. There was no paid head coach for the season. They went undefeated in 3 games.

Schedule

References

Miami
Miami RedHawks football seasons
Miami Redskins football
College football undefeated seasons